Arantxa Rus was the defending champion and successfully defended her title, defeating Polina Kudermetova in the final, 6–3, 3–6, 6–1.

Seeds
All seeds receive a bye into the second round.

Draw

Finals

Top half

Section 1

Section 2

Bottom half

Section 3

Section 4

References

External links
Main draw

ITF World Tennis Tour Gran Canaria - Singles